HMS Ilfracombe has been the name of two Royal Navy vessels:

  was a  minesweeper renamed Instow before launch
  was a  launched in 1941 and scrapped in 1948

Royal Navy ship names